Polo in Nigeria is as old as the country, first played by European naval officers in the early years of the twentieth century. The game was introduced to Lagos in 1914 before spreading to Northern Nigeria.

The rules of the game is managed by the Nigerian Polo Federation.

History 
The earliest games were played in Ikoyi on a strip of land shared between the Lagos Polo Club and Ikoyi Club. The first major competition started in 1914, when on behalf of kaiser Wilhem II, Wilhelm Solf donated a trophy to a competition between German Kameroun and British Nigeria, the annual cup was known as Kaiser Wilhelm Cup until 1960 when it became known as the Independence Cup. Support given the sport by the West African Frontier Force and cost of managing ponies encouraged many expatriates to take on polo. Compared to other part of the world, the cost of playing polo was less expensive to the European officials and civil servants. The West African Command had saddle clubs in various locations that advanced funds to officers to purchase ponies and provided stables where the ponies were kept. Most horses were Dongola breeds, Barbs or a local crossbreed called Asben.

In Northern Nigeria, the sport of polo found favor with the Emir of Katsina, Muhammadu Dikko, whose visit to Hurlingham in the 1920s influenced his decision to develop the sport in Katsina. The influence of the Dikko and his team composed of four of his sons raised awareness of the game among Northern elites. Emir Nagogo, his son and successor became one of the country's most decorated players with a handicap of +7 while his team from Katsina was dominant in the game from the 1930s, when it earned a blue riband and won the Gerogian Cup up until the 1950s.

After independence, when British civil servants and army officials went back to their home country, interest in polo was partly sustained by the military. A new military academy built in Kaduna in 1964 had polo exercises for his recruits. The Lagos Polo Club which was dominated by expatriates before independence relied on young businessmen and affluent Nigerians to sustain ground activities.

Major polo clubs 

 Lagos Polo Club
Kaduna Polo Club
 Port Harcourt Polo Club
 Fifth Chukker Polo and Country Club
 Jos Polo Club
 Kano Polo Club
 Katsina Polo Club

Notable players 

 Usman Nagogo
 Ahmadu Yakubu
 Idris Ibrahim
 Hassan Katsina

References

Sport in Nigeria
Katsina
Polo in Nigeria